Robert Lee MacFarlane (June 7, 1893 – January 25, 1968) was a Canadian politician. He served in the Legislative Assembly of New Brunswick from 1960 to 1967 as member of the Liberal party.

References

1893 births
1968 deaths